Xín Mần is a rural district of Hà Giang province in the Northeast region of Vietnam. As of 2019 the district had a population of 67 999. The district covers an area of 582 km². Its capital lies at Cốc Pài.

Administrative divisions
Xín Mần District consists of the district capital, Cốc Pài, and 17 communes: Bản Díu, Bản Ngò, Chế Là, Chí Cà, Cốc Rế, Khuôn Lùng, Nà Chì, Nấm Dẩn, Nàn Ma, Nàn Xỉn, Pà Vầy Sủ, Quảng Nguyên, Tả Nhìu, Thèn Phàng, Thu Tà, Trung Thịnh and Xín Mần.

References

Districts of Hà Giang province
Hà Giang province